Glitterball is a live interactive television quiz show in the United Kingdom, which launched in 2007.

Glitterball or Glitter Ball may also refer to:

 Glitterball (song), 2016 song by Sigma and Ella Henderson
 The Glitterball, a 1977 children's science fiction film
 Glitter Ball (RuPaul's Drag Race), 2014

See also
 Glitter ball